Ashray Bhardwaj  (born 12 January 2001) is an Indian professional footballer who plays as a defender for I-League club Sudeva Delhi.

Career
Born in Chandigarh, Ashray started his professional football career with Round Glass Sports and Chandigarh State Team. On 29 November 2020, Ashray was promoted to senior team of Punjab FC. Ashray made his professional debut for club in I-League on 9 January 2020.

Career statistics

Club

References

2001 births
Living people
Indian footballers
I-League players
RoundGlass Punjab FC players
Association football defenders
Footballers from Chandigarh